Last Year: The Nightmare is an asymmetric survival horror video game developed by Canadian studio Elastic Games. It was released for Microsoft Windows on 18 December 2018, distributed via Discord and later via Steam.

Gameplay
Set in a high school in 1996, the game pits five Classmates against a Fiend who can switch between three of four characters: The Giant, The Slasher, The Spider, and The Strangler. Classmates roam the map completing a variety of objectives in order to escape, while the Fiend tries to stop them from doing so. The Fiend is able to despawn and respawn outside the Classmates' line of sight with an ability called "predator mode". This mode also allows them to place traps for unsuspecting classmates.

Development

Kickstarter
In late 2014 Elastic Games decided to open a Kickstarter to fund the game. The initial goal was 50,000 CA$ but they ended up receiving 114,711 CA$

2016

In 2016 the first version of Last Year alpha came to live and it was the first design of the game. Most of the things of this build did not make up to the end of the game, such as: Barricades, light traps, wire traps...

2017

In this version of the alpha not too much things changed compared to the live version of the game but here are some of the things that were changed: 
-Thins could actually interact with the environment, for example: You could break the generator from advancing or stop the bell tower escape gate from opening.
-A workbench was added as an alternative to craft without a crafting kit.
-In the final build of this alpha there was a progression build that allowed the classmates and thins to gain exp. based in the actions that they made while playing the game.

2018
A trailer for Last Year: The Nightmare was released in September 2018.

Release
Last Year: The Nightmare had a closed beta period on 2–5 November 2018. The game was distributed "first on Discord" for 90 days, after which the game could also be distributed via other Windows game vendors.

2019

A re-launch, Last Year: Afterdark, was released on 10 December 2019 via Steam.

2020

Last Year: The Nightmare was released on 26 October 2020 via Steam.

Late 2021

Due to the bankruptcy of Elastic Games, the game is no longer available on any platform, and owners of the game cannot launch it.

2022
Due to the fact that the owners of the game cannot launch it, the development of the modification of Last Year: Resurrected began on August 11, 2022. The modification aims to bypass server checks as well as fixing up the code to be fully Peer to Peer without the reliance of game servers.

Reception

Last Year: The Nightmare received mixed reviews from critics. On Metacritic, the game holds a score of 73/100 based on 10 reviews.

Jordan Devore of Destructoid praised the art direction of the game, saying it made matches "spontaneous and varied."

References

External links
 

2018 video games
Asymmetrical multiplayer video games
Horror video games
Multiplayer video games
Survival video games
Video games developed in Canada
Windows games
Windows-only games
Unreal Engine games